Elliot Lee Richardson (July 20, 1920December 31, 1999) was an American lawyer and public servant who was a member of the cabinet of Presidents Richard Nixon and Gerald Ford. As U.S. Attorney General, he was a prominent figure in the Watergate Scandal, and resigned in protest after President Nixon's order to fire special prosecutor Archibald Cox.

Born in Boston, Richardson attended Harvard University. He served as Secretary of Health, Education, and Welfare from 1970 to 1973, Secretary of Defense from January to May 1973, Attorney General from May to October 1973, and Secretary of Commerce from 1976 to 1977. This distinction makes him one of only two individuals to have held four Cabinet positions within the United States government (the other being George Shultz). As of 2023, he is the last Republican to serve as Massachusetts Attorney General.

Early life and military service
Richardson was born in Boston, the son of Clara Lee (née Shattuck) and Edward Peirson Richardson, a physician and professor at Harvard Medical School. He was a Boston Brahmin, descended from the earliest Puritan settlers in New England.

Richardson attended the Park School in Brookline and Milton Academy in Milton, both in Massachusetts. He then obtained his A.B. degree in philosophy from Harvard College, where he resided in Winthrop House, graduated cum laude in 1941, and was an editor of the Harvard Lampoon.

In 1942, following America's entry into World War II, Richardson became a combat medic in the U.S. 4th Infantry Division. He participated in the June 6, 1944, Normandy Invasion as a platoon leader, where he crossed a minefield to rescue a fellow officer whose foot was blown off.

He was among the first troops to come up Causeway No. 2 from Utah Beach, which had been under fire from German artillery at Brécourt Manor. He was among the many who noticed the guns ceasing their firing after (unbeknownst to him) paratroopers of the 101st under Lieutenant Richard Winters had knocked them out. After Stephen Ambrose's book Band of Brothers was published, Richardson wrote to Winters and thanked him.

He continued on in the war in Europe with the 4th Infantry Division and received the Bronze Star Medal and Purple Heart with oak leaf cluster. He was discharged in 1945 with the rank of first lieutenant.

In 1947, he graduated from Harvard Law School. While at Harvard he became editor and president of the Harvard Law Review.

After his graduation from Law School, Richardson clerked for United States Court of Appeals for the Second Circuit Judge Learned Hand, and then for Justice Felix Frankfurter of the Supreme Court of the United States. Richardson joined Ropes, Gray, Best, Coolidge & Rugg in Boston following his clerkship, and became partner of Ropes & Gray in 1961 (the same year the firm, which was founded in 1865, became known as Ropes & Gray). Richardson left the firm to serve as U.S. Attorney for Massachusetts from 1959 to 1961. After returning to the firm, Richardson left permanently in 1964 after he was elected the Lieutenant Governor of Massachusetts and Attorney General of Massachusetts.

As of 2023, he is the last Republican to have served as Attorney General of Massachusetts.

Richardson was elected a Fellow of the American Academy of Arts and Sciences in 1958.

Richardson's older son, Henry S. Richardson, is a professor of philosophy at Georgetown University, where he focuses in moral and political philosophy.

Richardson was also an active Freemason as a member of the Grand Lodge of Ancient Free and Accepted Masons of the Commonwealth of Massachusetts and a 33rd Degree Freemason in the Scottish Rite Northern Masonic Jurisdiction.

Cabinet career

Richardson had the distinction of serving in three high-level Executive Branch posts in a single year—the tumultuous year of 1973—as the Watergate Scandal came to dominate the attention of official Washington, and the American public at large. He is one of two persons to hold four separate cabinet positions. He served three relatively uneventful years as the Secretary of Health, Education, and Welfare for a popular sitting president. In September 1970, Richardson was present at the funeral of Gamal Abdel Nasser, President of Egypt as part of America's delegation. He secretly met with Anwar Sadat, Nasser's successor to discuss a possible peace process with the United States.

In 1972, as Secretary of Health, Education, and Welfare, Richardson established The National High Blood Pressure Education Program, at the urging of Mary Lasker who came armed with copies of the Veterans Administration Cooperative Study Group on Antihypertensive Agents, directed by Edward Freis.

Richardson was appointed United States Secretary of Defense on January 30, 1973. When President Nixon selected Richardson as secretary, the press described him as an excellent manager and administrator, perhaps the best in the cabinet. In his confirmation hearing, Richardson expressed agreement with Nixon's policies on such issues as the adequacy of U.S. strategic forces, NATO and relationships with other allies, and Vietnam.

Although he promised to examine the budget carefully to identify areas for savings, and in fact later ordered the closing of some military installations, he cautioned against precipitate cuts. As he told a Senate committee, "Significant cuts in the Defense Budget now would seriously weaken the U.S. position on international negotiations—in which U.S. military capabilities, in both real and symbolic terms, are an important factor." Similarly, he strongly supported continued military assistance at current levels. During his short tenure, Richardson spent much time testifying before congressional committees on the proposed FY 1974 budget and other Defense matters.

Richardson would serve as Secretary of Defense for 4 months before becoming Nixon's Attorney General, a move that would put him in the Watergate spotlight.

In October 1973, after Richardson had served 5 months as Attorney General, President Nixon ordered him to fire the top lawyer investigating the Watergate scandal, Special Prosecutor Archibald Cox. Richardson had promised Congress he would not interfere with the Special Prosecutor, and, rather than breaking his promise, he resigned. President Nixon subsequently ordered Richardson's second-in-command, Deputy Attorney General William Ruckelshaus, to carry out the order. He too had promised not to interfere, and also tendered his resignation. The third in command, Solicitor General Robert Bork, planned to resign after firing Cox, but Richardson persuaded him not to in order to ensure proper leadership at the Department of Justice during the crisis. Bork carried out the President's order, thus completing the events generally referred to as the Saturday Night Massacre. Pat Buchanan reports on Richardson's dismissal that Nixon said in the Oval Office on the day of the Saturday Night Massacre, "I don't have any choice, I can't have President Brezhnev watch me be bullied by a member of my cabinet, I've got to fire him."

Just before the resignation of Vice President Spiro Agnew, Richardson was portrayed as a cartoon figure with Agnew and Nixon on the October 8, 1973, cover of Time magazine. Agnew was quoted as saying: "I am innocent of the charges against me. I will not resign if indicted!" Agnew later claimed the prosecution which eventually drove him from office was pushed by Richardson for the specific reason that Richardson wished to be nominated as the next vice president, which would either give him the inside track for the Republican presidential nomination in 1976, or, should Nixon resign over Watergate, elevate Richardson to the presidency. Richardson denied both then and later taking any extraordinary steps in the investigation of Agnew, instead leaving the task up to the United States Attorney for the District of Maryland.

In 1974, Richardson received the John Heinz Award for Greatest Public Service by an Elected or Appointed Official, an award given out annually by Jefferson Awards.

During the Gerald Ford administration, Richardson served as Ambassador to the United Kingdom from 1975 to 1976 and as United States Secretary of Commerce from 1976 to 1977.

Richardson's acceptance in 1975 of the appointment as Ambassador to the Court of St. James's, as it is formally titled, effectively eliminated him from the domestic scene during the pre-election-year period. In departing for that position, he indicated to reporters that he would not run unless Ford decided against running.

From 1977 to 1980, he served as an Ambassador-at-Large and Special Representative of President Jimmy Carter for the United Nations Convention on the Law of the Sea and head of the U.S. delegation to the Third United Nations Conference on the Law of the Sea.

Later life
In 1972, Richardson was awarded an honorary Doctor of Humane Letters (L.H.D.) degree from Whittier College. In 1974 Richardson gave the commencement address at Rose-Hulman Institute of Technology and received an honorary Doctors of Law. In 1980, Richardson received an honorary degree from Bates College. In 1983, Richardson was admitted as an honorary member of the Massachusetts Society of the Cincinnati. In 1984, he ran for the Republican nomination for the U.S. Senate seat being vacated by Paul Tsongas. Although Richardson was favored to win the seat, he was defeated in the GOP primary by more conservative candidate Ray Shamie, who lost the general election to John Forbes Kerry.

In the late 1980s and early 1990s, Richardson was associated with the Washington, D.C., office of the New York City law firm of Milbank, Tweed, Hadley & McCloy, of which John J. McCloy was a founding partner. In the 1980s and early 1990s, Richardson was the attorney for Inslaw, Inc., an American software company which alleged that its software had been pirated by the U.S. Justice Department. In 1994, Richardson backed President Bill Clinton during his struggle against Paula Jones's charge of sexual harassment. In 1998, he received the Presidential Medal of Freedom, the nation's highest civilian honor.

Death
On New Year's Eve, 1999, Richardson died of a cerebral hemorrhage in Boston at the age of 79. Major media outlets, such as CNN, recognized him as the "Watergate martyr" for refusing an order from President Nixon to fire special prosecutor Archibald Cox.

Author
Richardson was the author of two books. The Creative Balance: Government, Politics, and the Individual in America's Third Century was published by Holt, Rinehart and Winston in 1976. Reflections of a Radical Moderate was published by Westview Press in 1996. Reflections expresses his outlook:I am a moderate – a radical moderate. I believe profoundly in the ultimate value of human dignity and equality. I therefore believe as well in such essential contributions to these ends as fairness, tolerance, and mutual respect. In seeking to be fair, tolerant, and respectful I need to call upon all the empathy, understanding, rationality, skepticism, balance, and objectivity I can muster.

Popular culture 
An image of Richardson taken by photographer Garry Winogrand is featured on the cover art of rock band Interpol's 2018 album Marauder. Singer and guitarist Paul Banks referred to him as a hero, who "refused to be bullied into going against his personal principles".

See also 
 List of law clerks of the Supreme Court of the United States (Seat 2)

References

External links

 Social Security Administration Biography – Elliot L. Richardson
 

|-

|-

|-

|-

|-

|-

|-

1920 births
1999 deaths
20th-century American diplomats
20th-century American lawyers
20th-century American politicians
Ambassadors of the United States to the United Kingdom
American Freemasons
United States Army personnel of World War II
American people of English descent
American prosecutors
American Unitarians
Burials at Arlington National Cemetery
Candidates in the 1976 United States presidential election
Fellows of the American Academy of Arts and Sciences
Ford administration cabinet members
Harvard College alumni
The Harvard Lampoon alumni
Harvard Law School alumni
Law clerks of Judge Learned Hand
Law clerks of the Supreme Court of the United States
Lawyers from Boston
Lieutenant Governors of Massachusetts
Massachusetts Attorneys General
Massachusetts lawyers
Massachusetts Republicans
Military personnel from Massachusetts
Milton Academy alumni
Nixon administration cabinet members
Nixon administration personnel involved in the Watergate scandal
Presidential Medal of Freedom recipients
Radical centrist writers
Recipients of the Four Freedoms Award
United States Army officers
United States Attorneys for the District of Massachusetts
United States Attorneys General
United States Secretaries of Commerce
United States Secretaries of Defense
United States Secretaries of Health, Education, and Welfare
Watergate scandal
Writers from Boston